The Def Leppard & Journey 2018 Tour was a co-headlining tour by English rock band Def Leppard and American rock band Journey. The tour began in Hartford on May 21, 2018, and concluded in Inglewood on October 7, 2018.

Background
On January 19, 2018, Def Leppard announced they would be sharing the stage with Journey over the summer on a 60-city tour.

Setlists
{{hidden
| headercss = background: #ccccff; font-size: 100%; width: 55%;
| contentcss = text-align: left; font-size: 100%; width: 55%;
| header = Def Leppard
| content = 
"Rocket"
"Animal"
"Foolin'"
"When Love & Hate Collide"
"Let's Get Rocked"
"Armageddon It"
"Rock On" (David Essex cover)
"Two Steps Behind"
"Man Enough"
"Love Bites"
"Bringin' On the Heartbreak"
"Switch 625"
"Hysteria"
"Pour Some Sugar on Me"

Encore
"Rock of Ages"
"Photograph"
}}

{{hidden
| headercss = background: #ccccff; font-size: 100%; width: 55%;
| contentcss = text-align: left; font-size: 100%; width: 55%;
| header = Journey
| content = 
"Separate Ways (Worlds Apart)"
"Be Good to Yourself"
"Only the Young"
"Neal Schon Guitar Solo"
"Stone in Love"
"Any Way You Want It"
"Lights"
"Jonathan Cain Piano Solo"
"Open Arms"
"Who's Crying Now"
"Chain Reaction"
"La Do Da"
"Wheel in the Sky"
"Faithfully"
"Don't Stop Believin'"

Encore
"Lovin', Touchin', Squeezin'"
}}

Tour dates

Gross

The tour grossed $97.8 million, with 1,000,272 tickets sold.

Personnel

Def Leppard
Joe Elliott – lead vocals
Phil Collen – guitar, backing vocals
Vivian Campbell – guitar, backing vocals
Rick Savage – bass, backing vocals
Rick Allen – drums, percussion, backing vocals

with:

Steve Brown – guitar, backing vocals (filled-in for Phil Collen due to a family emergency May 25–28)

Journey
Arnel Pineda – lead vocals
Neal Schon – lead guitar, backing vocals
Jonathan Cain – keyboards, rhythm guitar, backing vocals
Ross Valory – bass, backing vocals
Steve Smith – drums, percussion

with:

Travis Thibodaux – keyboards, backing vocals

Opening acts
 Peter Frampton (Toronto)
 The Pretenders (Atlanta, Detroit, Chicago, Denver)
 Cheap Trick (Minneapolis, Boston, St. Louis, San Diego)
 Foreigner (San Francisco)

References

2018 concert tours
Co-headlining concert tours
Def Leppard concert tours
Journey (band) concert tours